The 2012–13 Karlsruher SC season is the 61st season in the club's football history. In 2012–13 the club plays in the 3. Liga, the third tier of German football. It is the club's first-ever season in this league, having been relegated from the 2. Fußball-Bundesliga in 2012.

The club also took part in the 2012–13 edition of the DFB-Pokal, the German Cup, where it reached the second round and will face 2. Bundesliga side MSV Duisburg next. The club had knocked out Bundesliga club Hamburger SV in the first round with a 4–2 victory.

Karlsruher SC also takes part in the 2012–13 edition of the North Baden Cup, having reached the second round against 1. FC Bruchsal after a 2–0 win over SpVgg Neckarelz in the first round.

Matches

Legend

3. Liga

DFB-Pokal

Squad

|}

References

External links
 2012–13 Karlsruher SC season at Weltfussball.de 
 2012–13 Karlsruher SC season at kicker.de 
 2012–13 Karlsruher SC season at Fussballdaten.de 

Karlsruher SC
Karlsruher SC seasons